Enrique Peñaranda assumed office as the 38th President of Bolivia on 15 April 1940, and his term was terminated by a coup d'état on 20 December 1943. A general in the Chaco War, Peñaranda was brought forth by the traditional conservative political parties, sidelined since the end of the Chaco War, as their candidate in the 1940 general elections.

Peñaranda formed six cabinets during his under 44-month presidency, constituting the 102nd to 107th national cabinets of Bolivia.

Cabinet Ministers

Composition

First cabinet 
Peñaranda's first cabinet was formed upon taking office on 15 April 1940 and was the 102nd national cabinet of Bolivia. Foreign Minister Alberto Ostria Gutiérrez was the only holdover from the interim Carlos Quintanilla government. Military figures Julio de la Vega and Demetrio Ramos were made Minister of Government, Justice, and Propaganda and Minister of National Defense respectively. Alcides Arguedas, a Liberal Party writer, journalist, and critic of the previous leftist governments, was made Minister of Agriculture, Irrigation, Colonization, and Immigration. Another noted writer, Gustavo Adolfo Otero was made Minister of Education, Fine Arts, and Indigenous Affairs. The Office of Fine Arts under the Ministry of Education and the Office of Irrigation under the Ministry of Agriculture were both newly established as part of this cabinet.

Second cabinet 
Peñaranda's second cabinet was formed on 11 November 1940 and was the 103rd national cabinet of Bolivia. With the resignation of Arguedas, the offices he held were redistributed to different ministers. In this and future cabinets, the Office of Immigration would be held by the Ministry of Government and the Office of Colonization by the Ministry of Defense. The Ministry of Mining and Petrol was assigned to the new Minister of Agriculture and Irrigation, Edmundo Vásquez. The Ministries of Propaganda and Industry and Commerce were discontinued. As was the Ministry of Hygiene, with the Ministry of Health falling under the purview of the Ministry of Work and Social Security. Health Minister Abelardo Ibáñez Benavente also became Minister of Work.

Third and fourth cabinets 
Peñaranda's third cabinet was formed on 12 June 1941 and was the 104th national cabinet of Bolivia. This cabinet saw the establishment of the Ministry of Economy separate from the Ministry of Finance and Statistics. Future President Víctor Paz Estenssoro was its first minister, though he only held the office for five days.

Peñaranda's third cabinet was formed on 1 October 1941 and was the 105th national cabinet of Bolivia. The Ministry of Agriculture remained vacant in both the third and fourth cabinets.

Fifth and sixth cabinets 
Peñaranda's fifth cabinet was formed on 26 November 1942 and was the 106th national cabinet of Bolivia. The Ministry of Agriculture was filled once again with the addition of the new Ministry of Livestock, though with the Ministry of Mining and Petrol being discontinued.

Peñaranda's sixth and final cabinet was formed on 16 September 1943 and was the 107th national cabinet of Bolivia. Faced with opposition from the left-wing in Congress, Peñaranda attempted to form a national unity government for his seventh cabinet. Representatives from the United Socialist Party (PSU) were invited to join the administration. These were Carlos Salinas Aramayo (Foreign Minister), the then-leader of the PSU, and Francisco Lazcano Soruco (Education).

In December of the same year, Enrique Peñaranda would be deposed by liberal forces of the Revolutionary Nationalist Movement (MNR) and left-wing young officers led by Gualberto Villarroel.

Established Ministries 

 Office of Fine Arts (under Education): Gustavo Adolfo Otero, first holder from 15 April 1940
 Office of Irrigation (under Agriculture): Alcides Arguedas (PL), first holder from 15 April 1940
Ministry of Economy: Víctor Paz Estenssoro (PSI), first holder from 12 June 1941
 Office of Livestock (under Agriculture): Arturo Galindo (PL), first holder from 26 November 1942

Analysis 
The six cabinets of Enrique Peñaranda reflected a brief return to the traditional political order Bolivia had seen prior to the Chaco War. The majority of ministerial positions were filled by members of the Genuine Republican (PRG), Socialist Republican (PRS), and Liberal (LP), parties which had been sidelined by the Military Socialist administrations of David Toro and Germán Busch. Three Bolivian presidents served in the Peñaranda administration. Minister of Defense Carlos Blanco Galindo had served as Interim President from 1930 to 1931. Finance Minister Víctor Paz Estenssoro and Health and Labor Minister Enrique Hertzog would both be elected president in the late 1940s and early 1950s.

Gallery

Notes

References

Bibliography 

 

Cabinets of Bolivia
Cabinets established in 1940
Cabinets disestablished in 1943
1940 establishments in Bolivia